Zalesice  is a village in the administrative district of Gmina Przyrów, within Częstochowa County, Silesian Voivodeship, in southern Poland.

The village has a population of 409.

References

Zalesice